Gavdul-e Sharqi Rural District is in the Central District of Malekan County, East Azerbaijan province, Iran. At the National Census of 2006, its population was 7,264 in 1,709 households. There were 7,492 inhabitants in 1,944 households at the following census of 2011. At the most recent census of 2016, the population of the rural district was 7,468 in 2,306 households. The largest of its 22 villages was Aq Manar, with 1,573 people.

References 

Malekan County

Rural Districts of East Azerbaijan Province

Populated places in East Azerbaijan Province

Populated places in Malekan County